Scarus zelindae is a species of fish of the Scaridae family in the order Perciformes.

Morphology 
Males can reach 33.2 cm in total length.

Geographical distribution 
It is endemic to Brazil.

References

Bibliography 

 Fenner, Robert M.: The Conscientious Marine Aquarist. Neptune City, New Jersey, United States: T.F.H. Publications, 2001.
 Helfman, G., B. Collette and D. Facey: The diversity of fishes. Blackwell Science, Malden, Massachusetts, United States, 1997.
 Hoese, D.F. 1986. M.M. Smith and P.C. Heemstra (eds.) Smiths' sea fishes. Springer-Verlag, Berlin, Germany.
 Maugé, L.A. 1986. A J. Daget, J.-P. Gosse and D.F.E. Thys van den Audenaerde (eds.) Check-list of the freshwater fishes of Africa (CLOFFA). ISNB Brussels; MRAC, Tervuren, Flanders; and ORSTOM, Paris, France. Vol. 2.
 Moyle, P. and J. Cech.: Fishes: An Introduction to Ichthyology, 4th edition, Upper Saddle River, New Jersey, United States: Prentice-Hall. Year 2000.
 Nelson, J.: Fishes of the World, 3rd edition. New York City, United States: John Wiley and Sons. Year 1994.
 Wheeler, A.: The World Encyclopedia of Fishes, 2nd edition, London: Macdonald. Year 1985.

External links 

 ITIS
 AQUATAB.NET

zelindae
Fish described in 2001
Fish of Brazil